The University of Toronto's Grey Cup dynasty continued in 1911, when they defeated their cross-town rival Toronto Argonauts at the new Varsity Stadium.

Canadian football news in 1911
Manitoba, Saskatchewan and Alberta Unions formed the Western Canada Rugby Football Union on October 21. The Regina Rugby Club changed its colours to blue and white. Winnipeg realtor Hugo Ross donated the championship trophy bearing his name; he subsequently drowned in the sinking of the S.S. Titanic in April 1912.

The Calgary Tigers won the Western Championship, contested by the Alberta and Manitoba Unions, and challenged for the Grey Cup, but the CRU would not accept the challenge because the WCRFU was not a full member of the CRU.

Regular season

Final regular season standings
Note: GP = Games Played, W = Wins, L = Losses, T = Ties, PF = Points For, PA = Points Against, Pts = Points
*Bold text means that they have clinched the playoffs

League Champions

Playoffs
Note: All dates in 1911

SRFU tie-breaker final

 Regina is SRFU champions

Alberta Rugby Football Union final

Western final

CRU would not accept Calgary's Grey Cup challenge because the WCRFU was not a full member of the CRU

East semifinal

Toronto Argonauts advance to the Grey Cup.

Playoff bracket

Grey Cup Championship

References

 
Canadian Football League seasons